St. Peter's Mission School is an ultra-modern day and boarding international school ranked among the top private educational institutions in Ghana .St. Peter's Mission School is an independent day and boarding school in Accra, Ghana providing an international education from pre-K through senior high school. St Peters Mission School was founded in 1990 by Mr Moses Adu Gyimah. There are two branches of SPMS which are the St Peters and Archimedes Sites. Currently St Peters is one of the best junior high schools in Ghana.

Facilities in the School 
There are about three ICT Labs and Libraries in St Peters Mission School. There is a swimming pool and a playground for the lower primary students. There is also a basketball court, handball court and tennis ball court. The school has a big and spacious Assembly Hall and there are two dormitories(Male and Female) for students who live far away from the school.

Achievements Of SPMS 

 Many students from St Peters who write the Basic Education Certificate Examination pass with flying colours. 
 In 2019, St. Peter's Mission School has been awarded by the Ghana Leadership Awards as the Best Academic School.
 St. Peter's Mission School receives an award from the West Africa International Press Ltd as the Best School in Discipline and Academic Excellence 2019 during the Ghana Private Schools Heroes of Distinction Conference/Awards held at the Holiday Inn Hotel on 11th December, 2019.

References

Education in Accra
1990 establishments in Ghana
Educational institutions established in 1990